Bukit Katil is a state constituency in Malacca, Malaysia, that has been represented in the Malacca State Legislative Assembly.

Demographics

History

Polling districts
According to the federal gazette issued on 31 October 2022, the Bukit Katil constituency is divided into 8 polling districts.

Representation history

Election Results

References

Malacca state constituencies